Mauro Leonardi (Como, 4 April 1959) is an Italian priest, writer and commentator.

Biography 

He was ordained a priest by John Paul II in 1988 and lived in Rome. Since 2015 he lives in the suburban district of the Italian capital, where he does his pastoral work. He's the chaplain of a high school and collaborates with his ministry in a parish in the same neighborhood.

His first novel is Quare, a science fiction novel (Ares, 2000). In 2003 he released Half an hour of prayer (in Italian Mezz'ora di orazione, Ares). In 2011 comes to light Like Jesus (in Italian Come Gesù, Ares), which gives its name to his blog. In 2012 he released his second novel, Abelis (Lindau). The Lord of Dreams (in Italian Il Signore dei Sogni, Ares, 2015) is his last essay. From 6 December 2013 to 11 November 2016 he publishes on his blog, a collection of 152 poems, entitled The diary of Paci (in Italian Il diario di Paci). The most famous poem is "Love is not enough to love" (in Italian L'amore non basta per amare), erroneously attributed to Frida Kahlo. In 2020 he wrote an essay entitled "Le religioni spiegate ai giovani. Convivenza e dialogo nella diversità" (in english "Religions explained to young people. Coexistence and dialogue in diversity) for Diarkos.

Activity 

His blog Come Gesù (in English  Like Jesus) is online since 2011. He writes regularly in some Spanish and Italian newspapers as an Agi (A Governmental information agency), the Italian edition of Metro International and in the daily newspaper of the Episcopal Conference of Italy (Avvenire). He writes columns on several family weeklies (Novella 2000, Gente, MIO). He also intervened during some television broadcasts of entertainment and current debate.

Disputes 

He has been the subject of numerous controversies by some Catholics in different parts of the world  who say that Leonardi wants to change the Catechism of the Catholic Church on the issue of homosexuality: on the contrary he says that, following the teachings of Pope Francis, simply look respectfully at this reality. He has been the object of attacks by some Catholics for interviewing Vladimir Luxuria who, on that occasion, recounted his conversion to Catholicism.

Works 

 Quare (Ares, 2000)
 Mezz'ora di orazione (Ares, 2003)
 Come Gesù (Ares, 2011)
 Abelis (Lindau, 2012)
 Il Signore dei Sogni (Ares, 2015)
 Una giornata di Susanna (Cooper, 2018)
 Le religioni spiegate ai giovani. Convivenza e dialogo nella diversità (Diarkos, 2020)
 Il diario di Paci. L'amore non basta per amare (KDP, 2020)
 Né santi né demoni. Interviste “eretiche” sul bene e sul male (Reality Book, 2020  )
 Via Crucis di Maria (Amen, 2021)
 Via Crucis vista con gli occhi d alcuni personaggi del vangelo (Amen, 2021)
 Il Vangelo secondo TikTok. Usare i social e restare liberi (Terra Santa, 2021)
 Cento volte tanto. Diventa manager della tua vita con il Vangelo (Ed. San Paolo, 2023)

References

External links 
 Oficial web site

20th-century Italian Roman Catholic priests
21st-century Italian writers
1959 births
Living people
21st-century Italian Roman Catholic priests